In number theory the n conjecture is a conjecture stated by  as a generalization of the abc conjecture to more than three integers.

Formulations

Given , let  satisfy three conditions:
 (i) 
 (ii) 
 (iii) no proper subsum of  equals 

First formulation

  

Second formulation

 
The n conjecture states that .

Stronger form

There are two different formulations of this strong n conjecture.

Given , let  satisfy three conditions:
 (i)  are pairwise coprime
 (ii) 
 (iii) no proper subsum of  equals 

First formulation

  

Second formulation

 
The strong n conjecture states that .

References

Conjectures
Unsolved problems in number theory